Jean-Marc Lederman is a Belgian keyboard player and producer. He has worked with bands such as Fad Gadget, The The, Gene Loves Jezebel, The Weathermen, Belgian rock band Streets, and Front 242, and with other artists including Julianne Regan, Jacques Duvall and Alain Bashung.

His main projects are The Weathermen, Kid Montana, Jules et Jim with Julianne Regan,  Ghost & Writer with Frank Spinath of Seabound, Man-Dello (a solo electronica project), and cover version project La Femme Verte. He composes music for movies and videogames.

He developed a musical iPhone app with Karl Bartos (ex-Kraftwerk) and Japanese multimedia artist Masayuki Akamatsu.

Most of Lederman's record covers are done by Erica Hinyot, a Belgian plastician.

Selected discography

Kid Montana
 Statistics Mean Nothing When You Are On The Wrong Plane (1982)
 The Las Vegas Gold Rush (1985)
 Temperamental (1986)
 Temperamental  + singles  (2008) double CD compilation

The Weathermen
 10 Deadly Kisses (1987)
 The Black Album (1988)
 Beyond The Beyond (1990)
 Global 851 (1992)
 Deeper (2004)
 Embedded (2006)
 This is the last communique (?) (2008) PIAS compilation
 Ultimate Poison (2010) 15 tracks MCD Infacted Records
 The Weathermen's Long Lost Instrumental Backing Tapes (2018) Wool-E Discs

With Alain Bashung
 Chatterton (1994)
 Fantaisie militaire (1998) (composed and performed the track "Ode à la vie")

Man-Dello
 Vaporetto to Eden (1994)
 Amoretto (unreleased album 2006)

Ether
 Helleven (1995)

Jules et Jim, with Julianne Regan
 Swimming (1999)
 Subtitles (2002)

La Femme Verte
Small Distortions (2010)

Ghost & Writer, with Frank M. Spinath from Seabound
Fourplay (2007) (4 tracks on a compilation album released by Nilailah Records (USA))
Shipwrecks (2011)
Red Flags (2013)

Leatherman, with Jacques Duvall
 Romania (2012)

Mari & The Ghost, with Mari Kattman
 "Superstitions" (2014)

Jean-Marc Lederman Experience 
 "The Last Broadcast On Earth" (2015)
 "13 Ghost Stories" (2019)
 "Letters To Gods (and fallen angels")" (2020)

Invisible Sky  
 Invisible Sky EP* 2016

Jean-Marc Lederman  
 The Space Between Worlds (2017)
 "Ode A La pluie" Music For An Exhibition About Rain (with Erica Hinyot paintings and poem) (2018)
 "The Helpless Voyage Of The Titanic" [Instrumental/Soundtrack]  (2020)
 "Music For Dinosaurs" [Instrumental)  (2020)

Lederman*Stein  with Erik Stein from Cult With No Name
Textbooks For Tomorrow (2020 - digital EP)

Lederman  De Meyer  with Jean-Luc De Meyer from Front 242
 A Tribe Of My Own (digital EP) 2018 
 Eleven Grinding Songs (album) 2018

Glassko & Fayzer  with Julianne Regan from All About Eve
 "Music to Relax You While You Struggle Under A Tory Government" (released 29 March 2019)

Music for films
 The Killing Woods (short) 2004
 Deadline (short) 2006
 Thunder And The House Of Magic (2013)
 African Safari  (2013)
 Doubleplusonegood (2018)

Music for video games
 Atlantis (2005) BigFishGames
 Fairies (with Julianne Regan) (2005) BigFishGames
 Mystic Inn (with Julianne Regan) (2006) BigFishGames
 Atlantis: Sky Patrol (2006) BigFishGames
 Hidden Expedition: Titanic (2006) BigFishGames
 Fever Frenzy (2007) Legacy
 Turbogems (2007) Ironccode
 Theme from SocioTown (2007)
 Forces Of Arms (2006) Wardogs Studio

References

External links
 Official site
 Profile on Discogs.com
 MusicBrainz page
 Mobygames profile
 Interview for "Here are the young men"
 Belgian Screenwriters Guild

Year of birth missing (living people)
Living people
Belgian musicians
Video game composers
21st-century Belgian musicians
20th-century Belgian musicians
Gene Loves Jezebel members